Amphicynodon was an extinct genus of caniform carnivore. It has traditionally been considered early bear, although recent evidence has suggested it may be a unique member linked to other pinnipeds. It was similar in size to early mustelids.

Fossil distribution
Some sites:
Ulaan Khongil, Mongolia 
Ronzon site, Auvergne France

References

Further reading 
 Rose, Kenneth David, The beginning of the age of mammals,The Johns Hopkins University Press (September 26, 2006)

Prehistoric pinnipeds
Prehistoric carnivoran genera
Oligocene mammals of Europe
Paleogene France
Fossils of France
Quercy Phosphorites Formation
Oligocene mammals of Asia